Vincenc Beneš (22 January 1883 – 27 March 1979) was a Czech painter.

Early life and education 
Beneš was born in Lišice, Hradec Králové. He studied at the Academy of Arts, Architecture and Design in Prague from 1902 to 1904 and the Academy of Fine Arts, Prague from 1904 to 1907.

Career 
From 1909 to 1911, and again from 1917 to 1949 he was a member of the Mánes Union of Fine Arts. His style was initially influenced by cubism and fauvism, and he later formed realistic oil paintings, showing the effect of Neo-Classicism. He contributed to the Art Monthly periodical.

Among his most important works include a series of landscapes for the National Theatre and some battlefields in France.

In 1963 he was named a National Artist.

Death 
He died in 1979 in Prague.

See also

List of Czech painters

References

1883 births
1979 deaths
People from Hradec Králové District
People from the Kingdom of Bohemia
20th-century Czech painters
20th-century Czech male artists
Czech male painters
Academy of Fine Arts, Prague alumni